Baaz Rockshelter is a prehistoric archaeological site in Syria. Located in the foothills of the Anti-Lebanon Mountains about 50 km northeast of Damascus, the site consists of a small (6 x 10 m) rock shelter favourably situated overlooking the nearby plains and springs. Excavations have revealed that it was intermittently occupied during the Upper Palaeolithic ( 34,000 to 32,000 years ago and 23,000 to 21,000 years ago), Late Epipalaeolithic ( 11,200 to 10,200 years ago), and Pre-Pottery and Pottery Neolithic. 

The site was discovered in 1999 and excavated by a team from the University of Tübingen between 1999 and 2004.

Further reading 

 "The 1999 Excavation at Baaz Rockshelter," Tubingen-Damascus Excavation and Survey Project, Conrad, Kandel, Dyab, 2006
 "The 2000 Excavation at Baaz Rockshelter," Tubingen-Damascus Excavation and Survey Project, Conrad, Kandel, Dyab, 2006
 "The 2004 Excavation at Baaz Rockshelter," Tubingen-Damascus Excavation and Survey Project, Conrad, Kandel, Dyab, 2006

References

1999 archaeological discoveries
Archaeological sites in Syria
Upper Paleolithic sites
Natufian sites
Neolithic sites in Syria
Pre-Pottery Neolithic
Rock shelters